The 2013 Depsang standoff, also called 2013 Depsang incursion, or 2013 Daulat Beg Oldi incident,
was an incursion and sit-in by a platoon-sized contingent of the Chinese PLA in the dry river bed of Raki Nala, in the Depsang Bulge area, 30 km south of Daulat Beg Oldi near the Line of Actual Control (LAC) in the disputed Aksai Chin region.
Negotiations between China and India lasted nearly three weeks, during which the Chinese position was supplied by trucks and supported by helicopters. The dispute was resolved on 5 May, after which both sides withdrew. As part of the resolution, the Indian military agreed to refrain from constructing bunkers 250 km away in the Chumar sector, which the Chinese perceived as threatening. The Chinese military in July 2014 acknowledged the incursion at the Depsang Valley in Ladakh region and said that such incidents occurred due to differing perceptions of the Line of Actual Control.

Background
The territorial incident occurred within a 38,000 square kilometre area of disputed territory between India and China, Aksai Chin. The Chinese claim that this area is part of Xinjiang, while the Indians believe that this area is part of Jammu and Kashmir. China and India signed two agreements, in 1993 and 1996, in order to establish protocols to resolve potential disputes in the region. These protocols included the mutual recognition of a "Line of Actual Control" (LAC), but disagreements continue between the two governments about where the LAC lies over a roughly 20 km-wide swath in this sector.  Indian media first said that the Chinese encampment was 10 km on their side of where they view the LAC, later revising that to 19 km.   Despite the disputed area being an "unpopulated and desolate wasteland", it is believed to be strategically important to China because of the presence of a highway. Since the late 1980s, border disputes between India and China have successfully been resolved through diplomacy.

After large-scale Chinese infrastructure improvements adjacent to the region, the Indian army began to develop the infrastructure on their side in the 2000s, which was perceived by the Chinese military as a potential threat. The Indian government claims that Chinese troops continue to illegally enter the area hundreds of times every year. Most of these occur without incident, but in 2011 Chinese military forces entered 18 km into the disputed area in order to dismantle "17 structures made up of loose stones in the shape of bunkers".

Incident

Military deployments

During the night of 15 April 2013, a platoon of 50 Chinese troops established an encampment in four tents in the dry river bed of Raki Nala in the Depsang Bulge, which represents the valley of Burtsa Nala or Tiannan River.
The encampment was discovered the next day by the Indo-Tibetan Border Police, who then set up an encampment of their own consisting of eight tents 300 meters away from the Chinese. The Chinese force was supplied by trucks and supported by helicopters. The Indian government considered this the most serious border incident in years.

The Indian military followed a policy of restraint, attempting to keep the issue "localized" and "tactical", in order to give the Indian government the opportunity to resolve the issue through diplomacy.  Throughout the incident no shots were fired and the Indian military did not attempt to outflank the Chinese.  Minimal efforts were made by the Indian army to reinforce the position after its initial deployment, though the two sides did raise banners encouraging each other to withdraw.  Much of the negotiations were conducted between officers present in the two camps. Western media largely interpreted China's actions as a show of force by the Chinese military, but some journalists speculated that the incident was possibly conducted by the Chinese military as a way to protest the perceived existence of a "permanent facility" that the Indian army had built in a disputed area. China's military think tank later tried to suggest that the incident was "accidental" and "not deliberately staged".

Resolution
The Indian government protested diplomatically, asking the Chinese to withdraw their military and to recognise the status quo that existed before the incident. The Chinese responded by publicly denying that there was any border issue, stating that their forces did not cross what they perceived the LAC to be. India opted not to take military action and pressed on with a long-planned visit to China by its foreign minister, Salman Khurshid. Within the Indian Parliament, the government was heavily criticised by the opposition for its handling of the incident who compared it to India's defeat in the 1962 Sino-Indian War. On 3 May, shortly before the dispute was resolved, the Indian parliament was adjourned after opposition members became disruptive, shouting "get China out, save the country".

The negotiations lasted nearly twenty days, during which the Chinese military increased their presence in the region. To resolve the issue, India agreed to a Chinese demand to demolish some live-in bunkers in the Chumar sector, 250 km to the south, and refrain from buildig more bunkers. Other Chinese demands included the demolition of Indian listening and observation posts built along the border, and an end to the undocumented passage of nomadic shepherds into the Chinese side, but it was not clear to what degree India agreed to these demands. Following the resolution of the dispute, the Chinese military withdrew. The standoff ended on 5 May.

See also 
Arunachal Pradesh
Sino-Indian border dispute
China–India relations
2020 China-India skirmishes

Notes

References

Bibliography

External links
 Four graphics illustrating the incident.

Conflicts in 2013
2013 in India
2013 in China
China–India military relations
Territorial disputes of China
Territorial disputes of India
Battles and conflicts without fatalities